"Very Special" is a song by Debra Laws. Released as a single in 1981, it is the title track of her first album, and features her brother Ronnie with call and response backing vocals.

The song reached #90 on the US Billboard Hot 100 during the summer of the year. It peaked at number 11 on the R&B chart.  On that chart, it ranks as the 64th biggest hit of 1981.

"Very Special" has been most notably covered and/or sampled by Big Daddy Kane and Jennifer Lopez, and has been the subject of lawsuits in this regard.

Big Daddy Kane cover

"Very Special" was covered by Big Daddy Kane featuring DJ Spinderella in 1993.  It was the second single released from his fifth studio album, Looks Like a Job For.... Produced by Kane, the song is a duet between Kane and Salt-n-Pepa member DJ Spinderella. The chorus was performed by vocalists Karen Anderson and Laree Williams.

The song became an American Top 40 hit, becoming Big Daddy Kane's first and only single to crack the US  Billboard Hot 100 chart, peaking at number 31.

Track listing

A-side
"Very Special" (Album Version) – 5:05
"Very Special" (Underground Mix) – 3:03
"Very Special" (Edit Without Female Rap) – 3:53

B-side
"Stop Shammin'" (Album Version) – 3:57
"Stop Shammin'" (Instrumental Version) – 3:57

Chart history
Debra Laws version

Big Daddy Kane version

Other cover versions and sampling
 In late 2002, Jennifer Lopez sampled "Very Special" in her international hit song, "All I Have", which reached number one in the US.  This usage became the subject of a lawsuit by Laws as a result of Elektra Records giving their unilateral consent to the sampling. 
 In 2013, K. Michelle sampled the song in "V.S.O.P.", which charted almost identically to Laws' original on both the pop (#89) and R&B charts (#13).
In 2015, Crystal Kay covered the song in Japanese, featuring Sandaime J Soul Brothers' vocalist Ryuji Imaichi. From her album Shine.

References

External links
 Lyrics of this song
 Debra Laws – Very Special (1981, AR, Vinyl)
 

1981 singles
1993 singles
Big Daddy Kane songs
1981 songs
Songs written by Big Daddy Kane
Elektra Records singles
Warner Records singles
Cold Chillin' Records singles
Rhythm and blues ballads
Soul ballads
1980s ballads